Creepy Carrots! is a 40-page children's picture book written by Aaron Reynolds and illustrated by Peter Brown. It was published on August 21, 2012, by Simon & Schuster Books for Young Readers. In 2013, a 10-minute animated film based on the book was made by Weston Woods Studios and narrated by James Naughton.

This book was followed by two more books, Creepy Pair of Underwear! and Creepy Crayon!.

Plot 

Jasper Rabbit loved carrots, especially the carrots that grew in Crackenhopper Field. They were "fat, crisp and free for the taking". Jasper enjoyed these carrots "on the way to school, on his way to Little League practice and on his way home at night", until he started to imagine that they were following him. He first noticed something strange after his Little League game when he stopped at Crackenhopper Field. He thought he saw three jack-o-lantern-jawed carrots behind him in the bathroom mirror. When he turned around, it was just a washcloth, shampoo bottle, and a rubber duck. Then while he was brushing his teeth, he saw the creepy carrots. Jasper yelled for his parents when a carrot shadow lurked up on his bathroom walls. "By the end of the week Jasper was seeing creepy carrots creeping EVERYWHERE." Jasper then came up with a plan to make sure the carrots couldn't escape. He built a fence and a moat around Crackenhopper Field. Jasper was very pleased with himself: "No creepy carrots would get out of that patch again." As the sun set, the carrots "cheered". Their plan had worked. Jasper Rabbit would never get into that carrot patch ever again.

Writer

Aaron Reynolds was born on June 4, 1970, and moved often as he grew up. He has lived in Texas, Colorado, Florida, Okinawa and New Jersey. He currently resides in Chicago, Illinois with his wife and two children. Reynolds has a degree in Theatre from Illinois Wesleyan University.

Illustrator

Peter Brown was born in 1979, raised in New Jersey, and trained at the Art Center College of Design in Pasadena, California. His first published book was Flight of the Dodo, which he both wrote and illustrated. It was published in 2005 by Little, Brown, who brought out his second and third books featuring Chowder, an oversize, slobbery pet dog who "never managed to fit in with other neighborhood dogs".

Characters  

Jasper Rabbit
Jasper Rabbit's Mom
Jasper Rabbit's Dad
 The Creepy Carrots

Reviews

Deborah Stevenson's review of the book Creepy Carrots provides a summary of the story. "Young Jasper has developed the habit of snatching carrots out of the field whenever he passes by it on the way to school, to baseball, to wherever. Suddenly, something strange happens: the carrots begin to follow him wherever he goes, lurking in the dark corners at night (he hears "terrible, carroty breathing") and disappearing before they can be seen by anyone else." Deborah notes the contrast demonstrated throughout the story: "The book balances menace and absurdity in this strange tale of vegetable stalking, playing up the contrast between the genuinely spooky elements and the unassuming threat." She also goes into detail about the images in the book. "Glossy black borders and smudgy pencil outlines lightened only by paler gray and set off by the orange of the carrots to provide a smoky Halloween flavor to Brown's nocturnal art, and the scenes are dense with creepy silhouettes and foreboding shadows. Brown meticulously controls his compositions and balances his spreads, often paralleling or mirroring verso and recto or tidily subdividing pages into panels."  

Paul Rodeen reviews the picture book Creepy Carrots!: "Reynolds makes liberal use of ellipses for suspense, conjuring the "soft ... sinister ... tunktunktunk of carrots creeping". Brown illustrates in noirish grayscale with squash-orange highlights and dramatic lighting, framing each panel in shiny black for a claustrophobic film-still effect that cements the story's horror movie feel."

Awards

Randolph Caldecott Medal - 2013 Honor 
Young Hoosier Book Award (Picture Book) - 2015
ALA Notable Video, 2014
Odyssey Award

References

2012 children's books
American picture books
Caldecott Honor-winning works
Books about rabbits and hares